The Woman Inside is a 1981 (but shot in 1978) drama film made by 20th Century Fox, and directed by Joseph Van Winkle who co-wrote screenplay with Steve Fisher (uncredited).  This drama film portrays the actions of a tough, but mentally ill, Vietnam vet who wants to have a sex-change operation. Her aunt (Joan Blondell) struggles to understand why she would want do such a thing.  The film was released after Blondell's death, ending a career spanning more than half a century. The son of Eddy Lawrence Manson now has released a new Project named after the film, The Woman Inside.

Plot

Cast
Gloria Manon as Holly/Hollis
Leo Köppen as Dr. Poeppen
Dane Clark as Dr. Rosner
Joan Blondell as Aunt Coll 
Michael Champion as Nolan
Marlene Tracy as Dr. Paris  
Michael Mancini as Marco   
Luce Morgan as Maggie
Terri Haven as Agnes

External links

1981 films
1981 drama films
American LGBT-related films
1980s English-language films
1980s American films